The 2012–13 Oklahoma State Cowboys basketball team represented Oklahoma State University in the 2012–13 NCAA Division I men's basketball season. This was head coach Travis Ford's fifth season at Oklahoma State. The Cowboys competed in the Big 12 Conference and played their home games at the Gallagher-Iba Arena. They finished the season 24–9, 13–5 in Big 12 play to finish in third place. They advanced to the semifinals of the Big 12 tournament where they lost to Kansas State. They received an at-large bid to the 2013 NCAA tournament where they lost in the second round to Oregon.

Pre-season

Departures

Recruits

Coaching

Roster
Source

Rankings

Schedule and results
Source
All times are Central

|-
! colspan=9 style="background:#FF6600; color:#000000;"|Exhibition

|-
!colspan=9 style="background:#000000; color:#FF6600;"| Non-conference regular season

|-
!colspan=9 style="background:#000000; color:#FF6600;"| Big 12 Regular Season

    

|-
! colspan=9 style="background:#FF6600; color:#000000;"|2013 Big 12 men's basketball tournament

|-
! colspan=9 style="background:#FF6600; color:#000000;"| 2013 NCAA tournament

See also
Oklahoma State Cowboys basketball (men's basketball only)
2012–13 Big 12 Conference men's basketball season

References

Oklahoma State
Oklahoma State Cowboys basketball seasons
Oklahoma State
2012 in sports in Oklahoma
2013 in sports in Oklahoma